Nalandil Hanım ("beloved nightingale" or "honest heart"; 1823 -  1865) was a consort of Sultan Abdulmejid I of the Ottoman Empire.

Life
Nalandil was born in 1823. She was a Circassian princess of the Natuhay tribe, daughter of Prince Çıpakue Natıkhu Bey, and had a sister, Terbiye Hanim, treasurer of the harem. Later, Terbiye married a Khalil Bey. 

Nalandil Hanım married Abdulmejid in 1851. She was given the title of "Fourth Ikbal". On 5 December 1851, she gave birth to her first child, a daughter, Seniha Sultan in the Old Çırağan Palace. Seniha Sultan married Mahmud Celaleddin Pasha in 1876 and had two sons from this marriage. Her elder son was Prince Sabahaddin Bey, was one of the founders of the New Ottoman Society.

Towards the end 1852 she was elevated to the title of "Third Ikbal", and in 1853 she was elevated to the title of "Second Ikbal". On 20 March 1853, she gave birth to her second child, a son, Şehzade Mehmed Abdülsamed. The prince died at the age of two on 5 May 1855.

In 1854, she was elevated to title of "Senior Ikbal". On 1 March 1855, she gave birth to her third child, a daughter, Şehime Sultan in the Old Beylerbeyi Palace. The princess died at the age of two on 21 May 1857.

Death
After Abdulmejid's death in 1861, Nalandil settled in the Feriye Palace. She died in 1865 of tuberculosis, and was buried in the mausoleum of new ladies, New Mosque, Istanbul. Her wealth was given to her daughter.

Issue

In literature
Nalandil is a character in Hıfzı Topuz's historical novel Abdülmecit: İmparatorluk Çökerken Sarayda 22 Yıl: Roman (2009).

See also
Ikbal (title)
Ottoman Imperial Harem
List of consorts of the Ottoman sultans

References

Sources

Concubines of the Ottoman Empire
1865 deaths
19th-century people from the Ottoman Empire
Ottoman Sunni Muslims
Consorts of Abdulmejid I